The Longdu dialect is a variety of Southern Min Chinese language originating from the towns of Dachong and Shaxi in Zhongshan in the Pearl River Delta of Guangdong. The two regions Shaxi and Dachong are together informally known as the Longdu region to locals and those overseas. There are more than 40 villages in the region and are held together by their shared dialect, which may be classified as endangered due to its deterioration in status and rapidly decreasing popularity even within the Longdu region. Despite its close proximity, the Longdu dialect is not very closely related to the surrounding dialects in the region, which belong to the Yue group. As such, Longdu forms a "dialect island" of Min speakers. It is one of three enclaves of Min in Zhongshan, the others being Sanxiang and Nanlang. Its native speakers generally understand Cantonese, but not vice versa. "A lot of children do not speak the language in their daily lives. The population of speakers is diminishing."

According to Søren Egerod, who published an extensive study of the dialect based on fieldwork conducted in 1949, the vocabulary consists of three layers:
 a pre-Tang colloquial layer, which seems to be related to the Fuzhou dialect,
 a Tang-period colloquial layer, which seems to be related to various Southern Min varieties, and
 a layer of literary readings based on the Shiqi dialect, the local Yue variety.

The Longdu dialect is a mother tongue of many overseas Chinese and is slowly disappearing due to the emigration of people from the Longdu region to other countries, and due to the lack of inter-generational knowledge sharing. Parents and grandparents teach the children only Cantonese given that the Longdu region is within Zhongshan, Guangdong. At school, only Mandarin is taught to children because Mandarin is the official national language, and Cantonese is generally viewed as the official language of the Guangdong province.

See also
List of Chinese dialects

References

External links
Phonology at Glossika

Zhongshan
Southern Min